The 2012–13 season is Panathinaikos' 54th consecutive season in Super League Greece.

They also competed in the Greek Cup. They were eliminated from the UEFA Champions League and the UEFA Europa League.

First-team squad
As of 31 January 2013

Transfers

In

Out

Competitions

Super League Greece

Regular season

League table

Matches

Sixth place play-off

Greek Cup

Third round

Fourth round

UEFA Champions League

Qualifying phase

Third qualifying round

Play-off round

UEFA Europa League

Group J

Statistics

top assisters
12 goals
 Toché (9 in Super League, 1 in Greek Cup, 2 in Europa League)

6 goals
 Lazaros Christodoulopoulos (3 in Super League, 1 in Greek Cup, 2 in Champions League)^

5 goals
 Charis Mavrias (2 in Super League,1 in Greek Cup, 2 in Champions League)
 Vitolo (4 in Super League, 1 in Europa League)
 Zeca (4 in Super League, 1 in Europa League)

4 goals
 Pape Sow (2 in Super League, 2 in Greek Cup)

3 goals
 Luciano Figueroa (3 in Super League)
 Ibrahim Sissoko (2 in Super League, 1 in Champions League)

2 goals
 Bruno Fornaroli (2 in Greek Cup)
 Antonis Petropoulos (1 in Super League, 1 in Greek Cup)^
 Loukas Vyntra (2 in Super League)^

1 goal
 Jean-Alain Boumsong (1 in Super League)
 Stergos Marinos (1 in Super League)
 José Manuel Velázquez (1 in Super League)

^He doesn't belong to the team's roster anymore

References

External links
 Panathinaikos FC official website

Panathinaikos
Panathinaikos F.C. seasons
Panathinaikos
Panathinaikos